Chalap or shalap or chalob, also marketed as Tan by Enesay, is a beverage common to Kyrgyzstan and Kazakhstan.  It consists of qatiq or suzma, salt, and in modern times, carbonated water.  The Shoro beverage company markets chalap as "Chalap Shoro".

In Uzbekistan it is part of rural culture which originates from nomadic traditions. In Uzbek cuisine it includes vegetables, giving it the appearance of a cold soup.

See also 
 Tahn

Non-alcoholic drinks
Kazakhstani cuisine
Kyrgyz cuisine
Uzbekistani cuisine